Erin Porter (born December 12, 1978) is an American short track speed skater. She competed at the 1998 Winter Olympics and the 2002 Winter Olympics.

References

External links
 

1978 births
Living people
American female short track speed skaters
Olympic short track speed skaters of the United States
Short track speed skaters at the 1998 Winter Olympics
Short track speed skaters at the 2002 Winter Olympics
Sportspeople from Saratoga Springs, New York
21st-century American women